Free Wave Technologies, Inc. designs and manufactures secure machine-to-machine wireless networking, communications, and computing systems. Their radios can capture and transmit data from devices such as sensors, gauges, valves, robots, drones, and unmanned vehicles over long distances (60+ miles / 96+ kilometers) in clear line-of-sight environments and harsh environments. Free Wave's radios support a variety of industrial applications, such as supervisory control and data acquisition (SCADA), wireless I/O, cathodic protection (CP), remote monitoring, telemetry, and analytics. Free Wave can provide long range, reliable and rugged wireless data links through both licensed and license-free radios.

The Company sells to a variety of enterprises such as energy, utilities, agricultural, government, defense, water, wastewater, manufacturing, and commercial enterprises. The company also conducts network designs, path studies, and pre-installation engineering services to support its customers.

History
Free Wave Technologies was founded in August 1993, by Jonathan Sawyer and Steve wulchin. From the beginning, Sawyer and wulchin aimed to help customers transmit mission-critical data via secure, highly reliable licensed, and license-free spread spectrum radios. Free Wave has manufactured all of its radios in Boulder, Colorado since the first radio was shipped in 1994. In June 2007, TA Associates led a $113 million investment in Free Wave Technologies. The company's major markets are oil & gas, government, and defense, agriculture, water and wastewater, and manufacturing industries since that time. Today, Free Wave Technologies has more than 800,000 industrial radios and embedded modules in the field.

Uses 
FreeWave's wireless M2M solutions are deployed across many industries including oil and gas, government, precision agriculture, traffic systems, water/wastewater, manufacturing, and other utilities. For instance, FreeWave radios are used by energy companies to maximize production and reduce operating costs for mission-critical applications within the military, and for environmental monitoring to provide warning of impending natural disasters such as volcanoes.

FreeWave M2M devices capture early-warning signs that an eruption is imminent and transmit images from the top of the volcano. With hundreds of thousands of residents living around the volcano, early warning is crucial to take precautionary measures and evacuate citizens before an eruption can take place.

The data provides information such as temperature and wind speeds for MWO's climate research. Weather observations are reported to the National Weather Service and National Oceanic and Atmospheric Administration for use in nationwide and global forecasting models.

The operator of a Rocky Mountain-based livestock facility implemented a secure ZumLink IQ edge solution with a custom application to monitor water levels in remote tanks from the cloud via an Internet connection. Using the Node-RED programming language, an app was created quickly and easily to gather data from analog sensors. The solution helps drive down operating costs by reducing the amount of travel for visual inspections in the event of a problem such as a leak that prevents a tank from filling.

The Sangamon Valley Public Water District (SVPWD) in Mahomet, Illinois, implemented FreeWave radios in a new SCADA system to communicate with remote wells and control equipment and settings from a central location rather than sending personnel to collect data and monitor the water system. SVPWD reported 50 percent cost savings, with savings expected to rise as leaks and inefficiencies are detected and corrected.

When strapped to a drone, FreeWave's technology can monitor remote environments and detect such issues as thermal fluctuations and fallen power lines in real-time. Then the radios can relay information to such parties as fire departments, insurance and telephone companies, and dispatchers.

Technology 
FreeWave's product platform includes edge connectivity and computing technologies designed to support a variety of network infrastructure, communication, and application requirements. Available models operate in the 900 MHz, and 2.4 GHz radio frequencies; support point-to-point (PTP) and point-to-multipoint (PTMP) configurations; utilize secure Frequency Hopping Spread Spectrum (FHSS); and communicate via multi-protocol Serial communication and Ethernet. Systems operate in temperatures from -40o C to +75o C (-40o F to +167o F). Interfaces supported include RS-232, RS-422, RS-485, and TTL. Models are available with 128/256-bit AES encryption and C1D2 certification. FreeWave's IQ Application Environment is available on its products, providing the ability to program, deploy, and run applications in any Linux-compatible language.

Products

FreeWave offers products that include a module, board-level, and enclosed radios for OEM and industrial end-user connectivity and computing applications.

See also
Frequency hopping
Radios
Spread Spectrum
Machine to machine
wireless
SCADA

References

External links 
FreeWave
TA Associates Leads $113 Million Investment in FreeWave Technologies, Inc.
The Industrial Internet of Things Takes Center Stage, but FreeWave says Wireless M2M Drives Its Success

Technology companies of the United States
Privately held companies based in Colorado
Manufacturing companies based in Boulder, Colorado